The Arida Border Crossing is an international border crossing between Syria and Lebanon in Arida, Lebanon. It is situated on the coastal international highway between Tartus and Tripoli, Lebanon.

Lebanon–Syria border crossings